A metal umlaut (aka röck döts) is a diacritic that is sometimes used gratuitously or decoratively over letters in the names of mainly hard rock or heavy metal bands—for example, those of Blue Öyster Cult, Queensrÿche, Motörhead, the Accüsed, Mötley Crüe and the parody bands Spın̈al Tap, Green Jellÿ and Moxy Früvous.

Usage
Among English speakers, the use of umlaut marks and other diacritics with a blackletter typeface is a form of foreign branding which has been attributed to a desire for a "gothic horror" feel. The metal umlaut is not generally intended to affect the pronunciation of the band's name, unlike the umlaut in German (where the letters u and ü represent distinct vowels) and the Scandinavian languages (where å, ä and a, ö/ø and o are distinct letters).

History
The first gratuitous use of the umlaut in the name of a hard rock or metal band appears to have been by Blue Öyster Cult in 1970. Blue Öyster Cult's website states it was added by guitarist and keyboardist Allen Lanier, but rock critic Richard Meltzer claims to have suggested it to their producer and manager Sandy Pearlman just after Pearlman came up with the name: "I said, 'How about an umlaut over the O?' Metal had a Wagnerian aspect anyway."

Reactions

Speakers of languages which use an umlaut to designate a pronunciation change may understand the intended effect, but perceive the result differently. When Mötley Crüe visited Germany, singer Vince Neil said the band couldn't figure out why "the crowds were chanting, 'Mutley Cruh! Mutley Cruh!'"

These decorative umlauts have been parodied in film and fiction; in an interview about the mockumentary film This Is Spın̈al Tap, fictional rocker David St. Hubbins (Michael McKean) says, "It's like a pair of eyes. You're looking at the umlaut, and it's looking at you." The heavy metal parody band Gwar parodied the use of metal umlauts in a lyric insert included with its first record, stylizing the song names with gratuitous diacritics. In 1997, the satirical newspaper The Onion published an article titled "Ünited Stätes Toughens Image With Umlauts."

Band or album name examples

English-speaking countries

 The Accüsed – American сrossover thrash band.
 Assück – American grindcore band.
 Barbariön - Australian metal band.
 Beowülf – California thrash metal band.
 Blue Öyster Cult – American hard rock band.
 The Crüxshadows – American alternative rock band.
 Dälek – American hip-hop band.
 Daniel Amos - American Christian alternative rock band released their 9th album in 1991 titled Kalhöun with band's name contracted to dä.
 Death in June – British dark folk/experimental band used umlauts and accented "e"s in their name and titles on the original releases of their albums The Wörld Thät Sümmer (1985) and Thé Wäll Öf Säcrificé (1989), spelling their name, Deäth In Jüne and Déäth In Jüné, respectively on each.
 Deströyer 666 – thrash metal/black metal band.
 Dethklok – fictional metal band from the cartoon Metalocalypse, sometimes spelled as "Dëthkløk" in the band's logo.
 Green Jellÿ – comedy metal band, originally spelled (and still pronounced) Green Jellö.
 G̈r̈oẗus̈ – Experimental band, their logo design has umlauts over only the consonants.
 Hüsker Dü – American punk band (the game "Hūsker Dū?" was published with macrons instead of umlauts).
 Infernäl Mäjesty – Canadian thrash metal band.
 Jack Ü – American EDM DJ duo, side group and collaborative project, consisting of Mad Decent founder Diplo and Owsla founder Skrillex.
 Jay-Z - American rapper (used umlaut over the y on debut album and promotion singles through sophomore album).
 Kïll Cheerleadër – Canadian punk metal band.
 King Creosote – Scottish band sometimes used a three-dot "umlaut" in some of their artwork, over the "i."
 Lȧȧz Rockit – American thrash band. German pronunciation would roughly be "Let's rock it."
 Läther – album of Frank Zappa, used an umlaut in its title.
 Leftöver Crack – American anarcho punk band.
 Living Colour's stylized logo has an umlaut over the u.
 Løvë – Aaron Carter EP
 Maxïmo Park – British indie rock band.
 Möngöl Hörde – British hardcore punk/noise rock band.
 Mötley Crüe – American glam metal band.
 Motörhead – English rock band.
 Moxy Früvous – Canadian political satire band.
 Night on Bröcken – debut album by American progressive metal band Fates Warning. Apparently a reference to the German mountain Brocken, which is not spelled with an umlaut.
 Queensrÿche – American progressive metal band.
 Rrröööaaarrr and Dimension Hatröss – albums by Canadian thrash metal band Voivod. They also used it for their songs "Korgüll the Exterminator" and "Chaosmöngers", which appear on Rrröööaaarrr and Dimension Hatröss respectively. The band's name is also occasionally spelled “Voïvod” such as on the cover of the album Phobos.
 Ruste⃛d Root – American jam band uses a three-dot umlaut over the "e" in its logo, as seen on its album covers.
 Spın̈al Tap – British semi-fictional band, with a dotless letter i and a metal umlaut over the n.
 Toilet Böys – American laser punk band from New York City.
 Ünloco – alternative metal/hard rock band.
 Up 2 Më – album of Yeat, used an umlaut in its title.
  Yächtley Crëw – Yacht-rock band from Los Angeles
 Znöwhite – American thrash band.
 2 Alivë – album of Yeat, used an umlaut in its title.

Other countries

 Аквариум - Russian rock band, whose name is stylized as "Åквариум" on their logo, and they use "Å" as their symbol.
 Crashdïet – Swedish glam metal band.
 Die Ärzte – German punk band, have used three dots over the "Ä" since their 2003 album Geräusch. The normal two-dot umlaut, Die Ärzte, is simply correct German for The Doctors.
 Girugämesh – Japanese rock band often stylise their name with an umlaut over the a.
 Infernal – Danish electronic band, was stylized as Infërnal on their album Waiting for Daylight.
 Insidiöus Törment – Liechtenstein-based old school heavy metal band who use gratuitous umlauts, but pronounce them nonetheless.
 Kobaïan – French progressive rock band Magma sing in this constructed language, which has many diacritic symbols in its written form. 
 Közi – Japanese rock musician.
 Mägo de Oz – Spanish folk metal band.
 Moottörin Jyrinä – Finnish heavy metal band, the umlaut in Moottörin is gratuitous, but the one in Jyrinä is not.
 Motör Militia – Bahraini thrash metal band.
 Mütiilation – French black metal band.
 Püdelsi – Polish rock band.
 Törr – Czech black metal band.

Other examples

Video games
 Brütal Legend – action-adventure video game
 Dynamite Düx – a beat 'em up video game
 Lars Ümlaüt – a character in the Guitar Hero series
 Dieselstörmers – a crowdfunded in 2014 pre-released steampunk multiplayer platformer
 Crüe Ball – a Pinball game featuring the music of Mötley Crüe

Other
 Häagen-Dazs – an ice cream brand (introduced 1961)
 Stüssy - the skateboard / punk / streetware brand started by Shawn Stussy (introduced 1984)
 Cröonchy Stars – a discontinued breakfast cereal (introduced 1988)
 Tonfön – the Tongan telephone company (introduced 2002)
 Brüno – film by Sacha Baron Cohen (2009)
 Jason Derulo stylised his stage name as "Jason Derülo" on his 2010 debut album and its promotion
 Löded Diper – name of the fictional band that Rodrick Heffley plays in the Diary of a Wimpy Kid book series
 Deathtöngue – the original name of a metal band in the comic Bloom County (changed, after media publicity, to "Billy and the Boingers")

See also
 Devil horns, heavy metal hand signal
 Disemvoweling in band names
 Faux Cyrillic (Faцx Cyяillic)
 Foreign branding (Häagen-Dazs, Fahrvergnügen)
 Nu metal, also stylized as nü-metal
 Sensational spelling
 Über
 Word play

References

External links

 My Life in Heavy Metal by Steve Almond (excerpt)
 The Döts (Dave Krinsky)
 Would you like umlauts with that? (PDF) by Bruce Campbell
 The Metal Umlaut in the Liff Dictionary
 Early history of this page (screencast) by Jon Udell

Umlaut
Latin-script diacritics
Nonstandard spelling